Ahvaz Metro is a metro system serving the city of Ahvaz, Iran. The first line with a length of 23 km is currently under construction with 24 stations. There are three other lines also planned for the city.

Lines

Line 1

Line 1 of Ahvaz metro is currently under construction. The line starts from the Northeast of the city, from in front of the power plant, going to the Southwest of the city, passing through near Ahvaz Airport, through Ahvaz old town on the left bank of Karun River, crossing the river and passing through Ahvaz Central Business and Administrative District and near Ahvaz railway station, passing the side of Chamran University, and continuing to the city's border to Baghaei Hospital.

The line is being built in 4 segments or phases. The first segment, consisting of 7 stations was expected to become operational in 2018.

Line 2

Line 2 of Ahvaz metro is planned for construction later. The line will run opposite of Line 1, from Southeast to Northwest.

Line 3

Line 3 is currently in the planning stage. it will run in an East West direction on the southern edge of central Ahvaz.

Line 4

Line 4 is currently in the planning stage. it will run in an East West direction further north of the city, just south of the airport.

Rolling stock
Rolling stock will be supplied by CRRC Nanjing Puzhen in cooperation with Wagon Pars.

See also
Rapid transit in Iran

References

External links
 Subways in Iran

Underground rapid transit systems in Iran
Standard gauge railways in Iran
Transportation in Khuzestan Province
metro
Ahvaz